Western Courier may refer to:

 The Western Courier, the school newspaper at Western Illinois University
 a British Rail Class 52 locomotive, D1062, Western Courier